WOL (1450 kHz) is an urban talk AM radio station in Washington, D.C.  This is the flagship radio station of Radio One.  It is co-owned with WKYS, WMMJ, WPRS, and WYCB and has studios located in Silver Spring, Maryland.  The transmitter site is in Fort Totten in Washington.

History
The original name of radio station WOL was WRHF, which went on the air on December 22, 1924. It was owned by an insurance agent named Leroy Mark operating as the American Broadcasting Company, unrelated to the ABC Radio Network begun in the 1940s. Its broadcasting equipment was said to have been rebuilt from a transmitter formerly located at the Y.M.C.A. building at 17th and G Streets NW. Its studios were on the third floor of the Radio Parlor building at 525 11th St. NW. Power was 150 watts and its call letters stood for Washington Radio Hospital Fund.

The station changed call letters to WOL on November 11, 1928, under a reallocation by the Federal Radio Commission, moving to 940 "kilocycles" (kHz). At the start of 1930, it was broadcasting at 1310 kHz. and at the start of 1940 at 1230 kHz.

WWDC was granted a construction permit by the Federal Communications Commission on October 29, 1940, to broadcast with 250 watts on 1420 kHz. It signed on at 1450 kHz. at 8 p.m. on May 3, 1941, airing programming from 8 a.m. to 1 a.m., and promising newscasts five minutes before every hour. Studios were at 1000 Connecticut Avenue.

On January 26, 1950, the F.C.C. approved the transfer of WWDC by Capital Broadcasting to People's Broadcasting Corp., having bought WOL, and announced the two stations would be swapping call letters. The change took place February 20, 1950. WOL morning man Art Brown moved to the new station while WWDC morning man Milton Q. Ford, who co-hosted with a talking parrot, was shunted to a 10 a.m. shift. The old WOL lost its affiliation with the Mutual Broadcasting System in the process to a station in Arlington, Virginia.

In 1965, the Sonderling Broadcasting Corporation bought WOL and changed the format from easy listening to rhythm and blues. That year, WOL also became the first rhythm and blues station in Washington to have public affairs programming. "No other medium in the city had WOL's influence and credibility among black Washingtonians from 1965 to about 1975...With finger-popping, hand-clapping and foot-stomping, they were the broadcasters of gospel-influenced, inner city culture," The Washington Post observed. WOL helped popularize "Chocolate City" as a nickname for Washington, according to the Post.

Originally simulcast on its FM sister station WMOD for more extensive coverage, they later changed the FM station to an oldies format. The station slowly deemphasized its music programming and evolved into an African-American based talk station.

For many years the pair was owned by Sonderling Broadcasting, who later sold its assets to Viacom Broadcasting. (After Viacom took over, WMOD-FM became country station WMZQ-FM)

Competition from FM stations that had stronger signals and stereo sound reduced WOL's ratings in the late 1970s. By 1976, the Federal Communications Commission concluded an investigation of allegations of payola against WOL and other black stations around the U.S. In late 1979, the Almic Corporation, headed by Dewey and Cathy Hughes, purchased the station. Dewey Hughes told The Washington Post: "The day of the rapping jock is over. Radio is generally toning down because of a new concern about contemporary adult music."

During the 1960s and 1970s, WOL was home to Petey Greene, a former convict turned popular talk show host, comedian, and activist, who began his professional broadcasting career at WOL. His story was portrayed in the 2007 film Talk To Me.

A Baltimore version of this station was created in the early 1990s; it is known as WOLB, and shares some of the same programming as WOL.

Notable hosts
 Joe Madison
 Ambrose I. Lane Sr.
 C Miles Smith
 Rob Redding

References

External links
WOL Website

FCC History Cards for WOL

African-American history of Washington, D.C.
Fort Totten (Washington, D.C.)
Urban One stations
OL
Radio stations established in 1941
1941 establishments in Washington, D.C.
News and talk radio stations in the United States